Ernst Heinrich Karlen, C.M.M. (1 February 1922 – 28 October 2012) was a Swiss Prelate of the Roman Catholic Church.

History
Karlen was born in Törbel, Switzerland, and was ordained a priest on 22 June 1947, for the religious order of the Congregation of Mariannhill Missionaries. On 26 September 1968 Karlen was appointed bishop of Umtata, South Africa and ordained on 3 December 1968. Karlen was appointed bishop of Bulawayo, Zimbabwe on 9 May 1974; he became Archbishop in 1994 when Bulawayo was raised to Archdiocese, and retired as such on 24 October 1997.

He died on 28 October 2012, in the hospital Mater Dei in Bulawayo, aged 90.

See also 
Archdiocese of Bulawayo
Diocese of Umtata

External links 
Catholic-Hierarchy
 Bulawayo Diocese

References 

20th-century Roman Catholic bishops in South Africa
20th-century Swiss Roman Catholic priests
20th-century Roman Catholic archbishops in Zimbabwe
1922 births
2012 deaths
Rhodesian Roman Catholic archbishops
Roman Catholic bishops of Umtata
Roman Catholic bishops of Bulawayo
Roman Catholic archbishops of Bulawayo